Rosetown was a provincial electoral district  for the Legislative Assembly of the province of Saskatchewan, Canada, centered on the community of Rosetown.

Created before the 3rd Saskatchewan general election in 1912, this district was dissolved and combined with the Elrose constituency (as Rosetown-Elrose) before the 18th Saskatchewan general election in 1975. It is now part of a revived Rosetown-Elrose constituency.

Members of the Legislative Assembly

Election results

|-

|Conservative
|Carnaby Willis Ferry
|align="right"|804
|align="right"|44.64%
|align="right"|–
|- bgcolor="white"
!align="left" colspan=3|Total
!align="right"|1,801
!align="right"|100.00%
!align="right"|

|-

|style="width: 130px"|Conservative
|William Thompson Badger
|align="right"|2,151
|align="right"|45.46%
|align="right"|+0.82

|Independent
|Thomas Alexander Sterling Campbell
|align="right"|501
|align="right"|10.59%
|align="right"|–
|- bgcolor="white"
!align="left" colspan=3|Total
!align="right"|4,732
!align="right"|100.00%
!align="right"|

|-

|- bgcolor="white"
!align="left" colspan=3|Total
!align="right"|5,195
!align="right"|100.00%

|-

|Conservative
|James Cobban
|align="right"|1,309
|align="right"|27.19%
|align="right"|-20.16
|- bgcolor="white"
!align="left" colspan=3|Total
!align="right"|4,814
!align="right"|100.00%
!align="right"|

|-

|style="width: 130px"|Conservative
|Nathaniel Given
|align="right"|3,440
|align="right"|53.05%
|align="right"|+25.86

|- bgcolor="white"
!align="left" colspan=3|Total
!align="right"|6,484
!align="right"|100.00%
!align="right"|

|-

|Conservative
|Nathaniel Given
|align="right"|2,105
|align="right"|32.81%
|align="right"|-20.24

|Farmer-Labour
|Wilfrid Albert Sibbald Tegart
|align="right"|1,878
|align="right"|29.27%
|align="right"|+16.44
|- bgcolor="white"
!align="left" colspan=3|Total
!align="right"|6,416
!align="right"|100.00%
!align="right"|

|-

|CCF
|John T. Douglas
|align="right"|1,941
|align="right"|28.73%
|align="right"|-0.54

|Conservative
|Andrew Wilson
|align="right"|951
|align="right"|14.08%
|align="right"|-18.73
|- bgcolor="white"
!align="left" colspan=3|Total
!align="right"|6,756
!align="right"|100.00%
!align="right"|

|-

|style="width: 130px"|CCF
|John T. Douglas
|align="right"|3,168
|align="right"|52.12%
|align="right"|+23.39

|Prog. Conservative
|John Wilbert Stewart
|align="right"|1,046
|align="right"|17.21%
|align="right"|+3.13
|- bgcolor="white"
!align="left" colspan=3|Total
!align="right"|6,078
!align="right"|100.00%
!align="right"|

|-

|style="width: 130px"|CCF
|John T. Douglas
|align="right"|3,647
|align="right"|53.12%
|align="right"|+1.00

|Prog. Conservative
|Alvin Hamilton
|align="right"|3,218
|align="right"|46.88%
|align="right"|+29.67
|- bgcolor="white"
!align="left" colspan=3|Total
!align="right"|6,865
!align="right"|100.00%
!align="right"|

|-

|style="width: 130px"|CCF
|John T. Douglas
|align="right"|3,922
|align="right"|64.07%
|align="right"|+10.95

|- bgcolor="white"
!align="left" colspan=3|Total
!align="right"|6,121
!align="right"|100.00%
!align="right"|

|-

|style="width: 130px"|CCF
|John T. Douglas
|align="right"|3,250
|align="right"|53.52%
|align="right"|-10.55

|- bgcolor="white"
!align="left" colspan=3|Total
!align="right"|6,073
!align="right"|100.00%
!align="right"|

|-

|style="width: 130px"|CCF
|Allan Stevens
|align="right"|2,657
|align="right"|40.39%
|align="right"|-13.13

|Prog. Conservative
|Raymond Michael Reilly
|align="right"|1,291
|align="right"|19.62%
|align="right"|-

|- bgcolor="white"
!align="left" colspan=3|Total
!align="right"|6,579
!align="right"|100.00%
!align="right"|

|-

|CCF
|Allan Stevens
|align="right"|2,367
|align="right"|37.36%
|align="right"|-3.03

|Prog. Conservative
|Les Patterson Hickson
|align="right"|1,396
|align="right"|22.03%
|align="right"|+2.41
|- bgcolor="white"
!align="left" colspan=3|Total
!align="right"|6,336
!align="right"|100.00%
!align="right"|

|-

|NDP
|Harry David Link
|align="right"|2,446
|align="right"|39.08%
|align="right"|+1.72

|Prog. Conservative
|Earl Keeler
|align="right"|862
|align="right"|13.77%
|align="right"|-8.26
|- bgcolor="white"
!align="left" colspan=3|Total
!align="right"|6,259
!align="right"|100.00%
!align="right"|

|-

|NDP
|Robert D. Loewen
|align="right"|2,953
|align="right"|47.48%
|align="right"|+8.40

|Independent
|Dale R. Skelton
|align="right"|189
|align="right"|3.04%
|align="right"|-10.73
|- bgcolor="white"
!align="left" colspan=3|Total
!align="right"|6,220
!align="right"|100.00%
!align="right"|

See also
Electoral district (Canada)
List of Saskatchewan provincial electoral districts
List of Saskatchewan general elections
List of political parties in Saskatchewan
Rosetown, Saskatchewan

References
 Saskatchewan Archives Board – Saskatchewan Election Results By Electoral Division

Former provincial electoral districts of Saskatchewan
Rosetown